John Herbert Percy Kissling (3 March 1868 – 11 May 1929) was a New Zealand cricketer and insurance company executive. He played first-class cricket for Auckland and Nelson between 1885 and 1890.

At the time of his death, Kissling was the General Manager of the New Zealand Insurance Company, for which he had worked since 1884. He married May Tuthill of Melbourne in 1897. She and their two sons and one daughter survived him.

See also
 List of Auckland representative cricketers

References

External links
 

1868 births
1929 deaths
New Zealand cricketers
Auckland cricketers
Nelson cricketers
Cricketers from Blenheim, New Zealand
New Zealand businesspeople